The pile hitch is a kind of hitch, which is a knot used for attaching rope to a pole or other structure. The pile hitch is very easy to tie and can be tied in the bight, without access to either end of the rope, making it a valuable tool. 

To tie, form a loop in the bight, and wrap both strands of this loop around the pole near the pole's end. Pull the loop around and under the rope, then finish by putting the loop itself around the end of the pole.

See also
List of knots

References

External links
http://notableknotindex.webs.com/pilehitch.html